Phyllonorycter lapadiella is a moth of the family Gracillariidae. It is known from Croatia, Serbia, Greece, France, Italy and Sicily.

Adults are on wing from April to September in two or more generations per year. Adults of the summer and autumn generations are distinctly smaller.

The larvae feed on Spartium junceum. They mine the stem of their host plant.

References

lapadiella
Moths of Europe
Moths described in 1909